Dùn Chonnuill is a small island in the Garvellachs in the Firth of Lorn, Scotland.

Dùn Chonnuill lies north east of Garbh Eileach, the largest of the archipelago to which it gives its anglicised name. There is a ruined castle, probably dating from 1400. The "hereditary keeper" of the castle is Charles Maclean, son of the late Fitzroy Maclean.

Footnotes

External links

Uninhabited islands of Argyll and Bute